Wanamie is an unincorporated community and census-designated place in Newport Township, Luzerne County, Pennsylvania. It is located in the southwestern end of the Wyoming Valley and uses the Nanticoke zip code of 18634. The South Branch Newport Creek forms the natural eastern boundary of Wanamie and drains it northeastward via the Newport Creek into the Susquehanna River. The village is named after the Wanami tribe of the Lenni Lenape. As of the 2010 census, its population was 612.

References

Census-designated places in Luzerne County, Pennsylvania
Unincorporated communities in Luzerne County, Pennsylvania
Unincorporated communities in Pennsylvania